Łódź Chojny is a railway station in Łódź, Poland, located in Górna district. Being an essential part of circular line, it serves the traffic between Łódź Kaliska and Łódź Widzew stations, and since 2011 it serves most of PKP Intercity trains passing through Łódź, mostly running between Warsaw and Wrocław.

History 
The station was opened alongside the circular line running from Widzew station to Łódź Kaliska in 1903. Initially it served both passenger and freight trains. In 1906 it was incorporated into the city of Łódź along with Chojny settlement, which was served by the station. During World War I track gauge was changed from 1524 mm to 1435 mm. In 1941 the station received a connection with Łódź Olechów cargo station. Electrification of the station took place in 1958.

In the 20th century, up until the 1990s, the station was a stopping point for international routes: Warsaw - Paris and Prague - Moscow. In 2002 the station was excluded from passenger services, serving only freight trains.

The station was reopened for passengers in 2011 due to closure and general reconstruction of Łódź Fabryczna station. Between 2011 and 2015 the station building was refurbished. Since 2015 the station is one of the significant elements of Łódź Metropolitan Railway.

Train services
The station is served by the following services:

 Intercity services (IC) Łódź Fabryczna — Bydgoszcz — Gdynia Główna
Intercity services (IC) Gdynia - Gdańsk - Bydgoszcz - Toruń - Kutno - Łódź - Częstochowa - Katowice - Bielsko-Biała
Intercity services (IC) Białystok - Warszawa - Łódź - Ostrów Wielkopolski - Wrocław
 Intercity services (IC) Wrocław Główny — Łódź — Warszawa Wschodnia
 Intercity services (IC) Zgorzelec - Legnica - Wrocław - Ostrów Wielkopolski - Łódź - Warszawa
 Intercity services (TLK) Gdynia Główna — Bydgoszcz/Grudziądz — Łódź — Katowice
 InterRegio services (IR) Łódź Kaliska — Warszawa Glowna 
 InterRegio services (IR) Ostrów Wielkopolski — Łódź — Warszawa Główna
 InterRegio services (IR) Poznań Główny — Ostrów Wielkopolski — Łódź — Warszawa Główna
 Regional services (PR) Łódź Kaliska — Częstochowa 
 Regional services (PR) Łódź Kaliska — Skarżysko-Kamienna

References 

Railway stations in Poland opened in 1903
Chojny
Railway stations served by Przewozy Regionalne InterRegio
Railway stations served by Łódzka Kolej Aglomeracyjna